This is the discography of British pop group S Club 7. The group went on to release 11 singles, 4 studio albums and 3 compilation albums throughout their career. The group formed in 1998 and rose to fame by starring in their own BBC television series, Miami 7 in 1999 and have been widely referred to as inspiring a new generation of teenage TV musicals including High School Musical and Glee. Over the five years they were together, S Club 7 had four UK number-one singles, one UK number-one album, a string of hits throughout Europe, including a top ten single in the United States, Asia, Latin America, and Africa, and went on to sell over 10 million albums worldwide. Their first album, S Club, had a strong 1990s pop sound, similar to many artists of their time. However, through the course of their career, their musical approach changed to a more dance and R&B sound which is heard mostly in their final album, Seeing Double.

The concept and brand of the group was created by Simon Fuller, also their manager through 19 Entertainment; they were signed to Polydor Records. S Club won two BRIT Awards in 2000 for British Breakthrough Act and in 2002, for Best British Single. In 2001, the group earned the Record of the Year award. Group member Paul Cattermole departed the group in 2002 citing "creative differences", and the group changed its name from S Club 7 to simply S Club. Their second to last single reached number-five in the UK charts, and their final studio album failed to make the top ten. After Cattermole's departure, the group fought many rumours presuming that they were about to split. However, on 21 April 2003, during a live onstage performance, S Club announced that they were to disband.

Albums

Studio albums

Compilation albums

Video albums

Extended plays

Singles

As lead artist

As featured artist

Promotional singles

Other appearances

Music videos

References
General

[ "S Club 7 > Discography"]. AllMusic. Retrieved 13 March 2009.

Specific

Discography
Discographies of British artists
Pop music group discographies